Play at Your Own Risk, Volume 2 is a compilation of punk rock/hardcore punk bands released by Recess Records in 1995. It was issued as a double 7" and single 5" in a tri-fold jacket and sometimes included a lyrics poster and Halloween napkin. It is notable for including several rare tracks, especially the Propagandhi song "Portage La Prairie", which was not released on their compilation Where Quantity Is Job #1.

Track listing
7" #1
 "Roadkill" - Quincy Punx
 "I Think I Got the Blues" - The Crumbs
 "Riviera Foom Style Now" - Black Fork
 "Abortion" - Annie & Candy Clutz
 "Graduation" - Second Hand

7" #2
 "Breakout" - Pud
 "Don't Care" - Slackers
 "Ruin Your Day" - Chickenhead
 "Shithole" - Les Turds
 "I'm a Criminal" - Teamsters

5"
 "Portage La Prairie" - Propagandhi
 "When We Grow Up" - I Spy

References

External links
Recess Records website

1995 compilation albums
Punk rock compilation albums
Hardcore punk compilation albums